— Wilfred Owen, concluding lines of "Dulce et Decorum est", written 1917, published posthumously this year

Nationality words link to articles with information on the nation's poetry or literature (for instance, Irish or France).
Fire and Ice by Robert Frost
Some say the world will end in fire,
Some say in ice.
From what I've tasted of desire
I hold with those who favor fire.
But if it had to perish twice,
I think I know enough of hate
To know that for destruction ice
Is also great
And would suffice.
--first published in December in Harper's Magazine

Events

 May – Irish poet W. B. Yeats concludes a lecture tour (begun in the fall of 1919) in the United States and crosses the Atlantic to settle in Oxford.
 December – The Poems of English war poet Wilfred Owen (killed in action 1918) are published posthumously in London with an introduction by his friend Siegfried Sassoon; only five of Owen's verses had been published during his lifetime, thus his work is introduced to many readers for the first time, including the 1917 poems "Anthem for Doomed Youth" and "Dulce et Decorum est"; the latter 28-line poem's horrifying imagery makes it one of the best-known condemnations of war ever written.
 Ezra Pound moves from London to Paris where he moves among a circle of artists, musicians and writers who are revolutionising modern art.
 The Dial, a longstanding American literary magazine, is re-established by Scofield Thayer; the publication becomes an important outlet for Modernist poets and writers (until 1929), with contributors this year including Sherwood Anderson, Djuna Barnes, Kenneth Burke, Hart Crane, E. E. Cummings, Charles Demuth, Kahlil Gibran, Gaston Lachaise, Amy Lowell, Marianne Moore, Ezra Pound, Odilon Redon, Bertrand Russell, Carl Sandburg, Van Wyck Brooks, and W. B. Yeats.
 First issue of the anthology of Scottish poetry, Northern Notes, edited by Christopher Murray Grieve.
 Russian poet Nikolay Gumilyov co-founds the "All-Russia Union of Writers" in the Soviet Union, where he makes no secret of his anti-Communist views, crosses himself in public, and doesn't care to hide his contempt for half-literate Bolsheviks. His fate changes in 1921.

Works published in English

United Kingdom
 Maurice Baring, Poems 1914–1919
 Edmund Blunden, The Waggoner and Other Poems
 Robert Bridges, October, and Other Poems
 Cambridge Poets 1914–1920, anthology edited by Edward Davison
 W. H. Davies, The Song of Life, and Other Poems
 Walter de la Mare, Poems 1901 to 1918
 T. S. Eliot:
 Poems, including Gerontion (text) and Sweeney Among the Nightingales
 The Sacred Wood: Essays on Poetry and Criticism
 Robert Graves, Country Sentiment
 Aldous Huxley, Leda
 India in Song: Eastern Themes in English Verse by British and Indian Poets, an anthology of Indian poetry in English published in the UK (London: Oxford)
 John Masefield, Enslaved, and Other Poems
 Hope Mirrlees, Paris: A Poem (Hogarth Press, 1st edition misdated 1919)
 Harold Monro, Some Contemporary Poets (1920), criticism
 Wilfred Owen, Poems, introduction by Siegfried Sassoon (posthumous)
 Ruth Pitter, First Poems
 Ezra Pound, American poet published in the United Kingdom:
 Hugh Selwyn Mauberley, London
 Umbra, London
 Nina Salaman, The Voices of the Rivers
 Siegfried Sassoon, Picture Show
 Edward Thomas, Collected Poems, foreword by Walter de la Mare
 Iris Tree, Poems
 Valour and Vision: Poems of the War, 1914-1918, anthology edited by Jacqueline T. Trotter
 Charles Williams, Divorce
 Humbert Wolfe:
 London Sonnets
 Shylock Reasons with Mr. Chesterton, and Other Poems
 W. B. Yeats, Irish poet published in the United Kingdom, "The Second Coming" first published in The Dial magazine for November (published again in 1921 in Yeats' Michael Robartes and the Dancer)

United States

 Stephen Vincent Benet, Heavens and Earth
 Witter Bynner, A Canticle of Pan
 Hart Crane publishes his poem "My Grandmother's Love Letters" in The Dial. This is his first real step towards recognition as a poet.
 W.E.B. Du Bois, Darkwater
 Robert Frost, Miscellaneous Poems
 William Ellery Leonard, The Lynching Bee
 Edgar Lee Masters, Domesday Book
 Edna St. Vincent Millay, A Few Figs From Thistles
 Ezra Pound, American poet published in the United Kingdom:
 Hugh Selwyn Mauberley, London
 Umbra, London
 Lizette Woodworth Reese, Spicewood
 Charles Reznikoff, Poems published by the New York Poetry Book Shop; the book features poems from Reznikoff's Rhythms and Rhythms II
From Bettyby Lola Ridge
My doll Janie has no waist
and her body is like a tub with feet on it.
Sometimes I beat her
but I always kiss her afterwards.
When I have kissed all the paint off her body
I shall tie a ribbon about it
so she shan't look shabby.
But it must be blue--
it mustn't be pink--
pink shows the dirt on her face
that won't wash off.
 Lola Ridge, Sun-Up, including "Betty"
 Edward Arlington Robinson:
 Lancelot
 The Three Taverns
 Carl Sandburg, Smoke and Steel
 Sara Teasdale, Flame and Shadow, including" There Will Come Soft Rains"
 Galway Wescott, The Bitterns
 William Carlos Williams, Kora in Hell. Improvisations

Other in English
 India in Song: Eastern Themes in English Verse by British and Indian Poets, London: Oxford; anthology; Indian poetry in English, published in the United Kingdom
 Yone Noguchi, Japanese Hokkus, Japanese poet writing in English
 Maneck B. Pithawalla, Sacred Sparks, Karachi: M. B. Pithawalla
 Tom Redcam, San Gloria, verse play, Jamaica
 W.B. Yeats, Irish poet published in the United Kingdom, The Second Coming first published in the November issue of The Dial magazine (see quotation, above; published again in Michael Robartes and the Dancer 1921)

Works published in other languages

France
 Louis Aragon, Feu de joie
 Jean Cocteau, Poésies 1917–1920
 Philippe Soupault, Rose des vents
 Tristan Tzara, pen name of Sami Rosenstock, Cinéma calendrier coeur abstrait maisons
 Charles Vildrac, Chants du désespéré

Indian subcontinent
Including all of the British colonies that later became India, Pakistan, Bangladesh, Sri Lanka and Nepal. Listed alphabetically by first name, regardless of surname:

Telugu poetry
 Garimella Satyanarayana, Makoddi tella doratanamu, a Telugu-language song famously used by Indians marching for freedom; the very militant lyric was banned for a time by the colonial government, which arrested the poet
 Rami Reddi also known as "Duvvuri":
 Jaladangana, celebrates farming season and the beauty of nature in the rural countryside, Indian, Telugu-language
 Venakumari, Telugu-language pastoral poems depicting the struggles of peasants

Other Indian languages
 Ananda Chandra Agarwala, Jilikani, Assamese-language poem reflecting ancient Assamese ballads
 Bhaskar Ramchandra Tambe, Tambe Yanci Kavita, Marathi-language poems; edited by V. G. Mayadev
 Chanda Jha, Mahes Vani Sanghra, Maithili-language devotional songs addressed to Lord Siva
 Dharanidhar Sharma Koirala, Naibedya, Nepali-language poetry, didactic poems popular in Darjeeling
 Lala Kirpa Sagar, Laksmi Devi, Punjabi-language, long, narrative epic poem modeled on Sir Walter Scott's The Lady of the Lake; depicts Maharaja Ranjit Singh's battles with Jaimal Singh, a hill chieftain
 Pt. Ram Naresh Tripathi, Pathik, very popular Hindi-language Khanda Kavya which went into 30 editions; patriotic and expressing love of the rural countryside; strongly influenced by Gandhi's thought
 Surendra Jha 'Suman', also known as "Suman", Candi Carya, adaptation of Durgasaptasati in verse, Maithili-language
 Vaijanath Kashinath Rajwade, Kesavasutanci Kavita, Marathi-language article offering the first thematic classification and detailed analysis of Keshavsut's poems, criticism published in the monthly Manoranjan in July, September, October and November

Spanish language
 Enrique Bustamante y Ballivián, Poemas autóctonos, Peru
 León Felipe, Veersos y oraciones del caminante ("Verses and Prayers of the Walker"), first volume (second volume, 1930), Spain
 Alfonsina Storni, Langour, Argentina
 Miguel de Unamuno, El Christo de Velázquez ("Christ by Velázquez"), Spain

Other languages
 Piaras Béaslaí, "Bealtaine 1916" agus Dánta Eile, Ireland
 António Botto, Canções do Sul ("Songs of the South"), Portugal
 Ernst Enno, Valge öö, Estonia
 Kahlil Gibran, Al-'Awāsif ("The Tempests") and Spirits Rebellious (English translation), Lebanese-born Arabic poet in the United States
 Vladislav Khodasevich, The Way of Corn, Russia
 Tom Kristensen, Pirate Dreams, Denmark
 Jan Lechon, The Scarlet Poem, Poland
 Boleslaw Lesmian, The Meadow, Poland
 Eugenio Montale, Ossi di seppia ("Cuttlefish bones"), Italy
 Les Poètes contre la guerre, France
 Anton Schnack, Tier rang gewaltig mit Tier ("Beast strove mightily with beast"), Germany
 Edith Sodergran, The Shadow of the Future, Sweden
 Georg Trakl, Der Herbst des Einsamen ("The Autumn of The Lonely"), Austrian native published in Germany
 Pavlo Tychyna, Instead of Sonnets or Octaves, Ukraine
 Tin Ujević, Lelek sebra ("Cry of a slave"), Croatian
 Henrik Visnapuu, Talihari, Hõbedased kuljused and Käoorvik, Estonia

Awards and honors

Births
Death years link to the corresponding "[year] in poetry" article:
 January 24 – Keith Douglas (killed in action 1944), English poet
 February 21 – Ishigaki Rin 石垣りん (died 2004), Japanese poet; she was an employee of the Industrial Bank of Japan, sometimes called "the bank teller poet"
 February 23 – David Wright (died 1994), South African-born English poet
 February 29 – Howard Nemerov (died 1991), American poet, United States Poet Laureate from 1963 to 1964 and from 1988 to 1990
 March 5 – Madhunapantula Satyanarayana Sastry (died 1992), Indian, Telugu-language poet (surname: Satyanarayanashastri)
 March 11 – D. J. Enright (died 2002), English academic, poet, novelist and critic
 March 24 – Balachandra Rajan (died 2009), Indian critic, novelist and writer of Indian poetry in English
 April 27 – Edwin Morgan (died 2010), Scottish poet and translator
 June 13 – Ruth Guimarães (died 2014), Afro-Brazilian classicist, fiction writer and poet
 June 15 – Amy Clampitt (died 1994), American poet and author
 June 18 – Rosemary Dobson (died 2012), Australian poet
 July 18 – Zheng Min (died 2022), Chinese poet
 August 16 – Charles Bukowski (died 1994), American poet, novelist and short-story writer
 August 18 – Harbhajan Singh (died 2002), Indian, Punjabi poet in the Sahajvadi tradition, also a critic, cultural commentator and translator
 September 6 – Barbara Guest née Barbara Ann Pinson (died 2006), American poet and critic
 September 18 – Doris Mühringer (died 2009), Austrian poet, short-story writer and children's writer
 October 24 – Robert Greacen (died 2008), Irish poet
 November 3 – Oodgeroo Noonuccal (died 1993), Australian poet, actress, writer, teacher, artist and campaigner for Aboriginal causes
 November 23 – Paul Celan (died 1970), German-language poet born to a German-speaking Jewish family in a place at this time part of Romania (part of modern-day Ukraine)
 November 28 – Alexander Scott (died 1989), Scottish poet and literary scholar
 Also:
 V. A. Anandakkuttan (died 1969), Indian, Malayalam-language poet and author of humorous essays and farces
 Bernardino Evaristo Mendes, also known as B. E. Mendes, Indian, Konkani-language poet known for philosophical and theosophical writing
 Birendra Chattopadhyay (died 1985), Bengali-language poet and Marxist
 Jayant Pathak, Indian, Gujarati-language poet and critic
 K. B. Nikumb, Indian, Marathi-language poet
 Manmohan Misra, Indian poet and essayist in Orissa
 Natvarlal Kuberdas Pandya (pen name, "Usanas"), Indian, Gujarati-language poet and critic
 Okiyuma Gwaynn, Indian poet writing Indian poetry in English and then in Nepali; born in Hong Kong to a Japanese father and Tibetan mother, he settles in Darjeeling in 1946
 Ram Lal Papiha, Indian, Dogri-language poet
 Rentala Gopalakrishna, Indian, Telugu-language poet and playwright
 Santokh Singh Dheer, Indian, Punjabi poet and fiction writer in the largely romantic and progressive-in-outlook Amrita-Mohan Singh tradition of Punjabi
 Tulasibahadur Chetri, nicknamed "Apatan", Indian, Nepali-language poet and playwright

Deaths

Birth years link to the corresponding "[year] in poetry" article:
 February 7 – Dollie Radford, 61, English poet and writer
 February 8 – Richard Dehmel, 56, German poet
 February 19 – Ernest Hartley Coleridge (born 1846), English scholar and poet, grandson of Samuel Taylor Coleridge
 May 11 – William Dean Howells, 83, American literary critic, author and poet
 June 5 – Julia A. Moore, the "Sweet Singer of Michigan", 72, American poetaster, famed for her notoriously bad poetry
 July 3 – Charles E. Carryl, 78, American children's poet
 September 16 – Dan Andersson, 32, Swedish poet, accidentally poisoned
 November 2 – Louise Imogen Guiney, 59, American-born poet
 November 18 – Matthías Jochumsson, 85, Icelandic lyric poet, playwright, translator and pastor
 December 21 – Mohammed Abdullah Hassan, 56, Somali poet, religious and nationalist leader who for 20 years led armed resistance to the British, Italian, and Ethiopian forces in Somalia and used his patriotic poetry to rally his supporters
 December 24 – Matilda Maranda Crawford, 76, American-Canadian poet, writer, correspondent
 Also:
 Devendranath Sen (born 1855), Indian, Bengali-language poet
 Divakarla Tirupti Shastri (born 1872), Indian, Telugu-language poet; one of the two poets known in Telugu literature as "Triupati Vankata Kavulu"
 Eknath Pandurang Randalkar (born 1887), Indian, Marathi-language poet and translator from Sanskrit, English, Bengali and Gujarati poetry
 Jammuneshwar Khataniyar (born 1899), Indian, Assamese-language poet; a woman
 Mian Hidayatulla (birth year not known), Indian, Punjabi-language poet
 Nagesh Vishwanath Pai, also spelled "Nagesh Vishvanath Pai" (born 1860), Indian, Marathi-language poet and fiction writer
 Vishvanatha Dev Varma (born 1850), Indian, Sanskrit-language poet

Notes

See also

 Poetry
 List of years in poetry

Poetry, 1920 In
20th-century poetry
 Poetry, 1920 In